The 2021–22 Ford Trophy was the 51st season of The Ford Trophy, the List A cricket tournament that was played in New Zealand. It was the eleventh in a sponsorship deal between New Zealand Cricket and Ford Motor Company. The tournament ran from November 2021 to February 2022. In July 2021, New Zealand Cricket named all the squads for the domestic teams ahead of the 2021–22 season, and confirmed the fixtures in September 2021. Canterbury were the defending champions.

Following the completion of matches played on 20 February 2022, Central Districts were the first team to reach the final of the tournament. They were joined by Auckland, who beat Otago in their penultimate group match to secure their berth in the final. In the final, Auckland beat Central Districts by eight wickets to win the tournament.

Points table

 Advanced to the Final

Fixtures

Final

References

External links
Series home at ESPN Cricinfo

Ford Trophy
2021–22 New Zealand cricket season
Ford Trophy